Scythris subcassiterella is a moth of the family Scythrididae. It was described by Bengt Å. Bengtsson in 1997. It is found in the Russian Far East (Primorye).

References

subcassiterella
Moths described in 1997